In organic chemistry, secondary amino acids are amino acids which do not contain the amino group  but is rather a secondary amine. Secondary amino acids can be classified to cyclic acids, such as proline, and acyclic N-substituted amino acids.

In nature, proline, hydroxyproline, pipecolic acid and sarcosine are well-known secondary amino acids. Proline is the only proteinogenic secondary amino acids. Other secondary amino acids are non-proteinogenic amino acids. In protein, hydroxyproline is incorporated into protein by hydroxylation of proline. Pipecolic acid, a heavier analog of proline, is found in efrapeptin. Sarcosine is a N-methylized glycine so its methyl group is used in many biochemical reactions. Azetidine-2-carboxylic acid, which is a smaller homolog of proline in plants.

Properties 

Proline and its higher homolog pipecolic acid affect the secondary structure of protein.  D-alpha-amino acid - L-alpha-amino acid sequence can induce beta hairpin. It suggested that acyclic secondary amino acids are more flexible than cyclic secondary amino acids in protein by replacement of pipecolic acid by N-methyl-L-alanine in efrapeptin C.

Ninhydrin tests of proline and hydroxyproline give yellow results.

In enzymology, a N-methyl-L-amino-acid oxidase is an oxidase of a subtype of secondary amino acids.

See also 
 Imino acid
 Imidic acid
 Secondary amine

References

External links 

Amino acids